The 1962 Rice Owls football team represented Rice University during the 1962 NCAA University Division football season. In its 23rd season under head coach Jess Neely, the team compiled a 2–6–2 record and was outscored by a total of 173 to 119. The team played its home games at Rice Stadium in Houston, Texas, where just before the season John F. Kennedy delivered his "We choose to go to the Moon" speech.

The team's statistical leaders included Randall Kerbow with 703 passing yards, Paul Piper with 387 rushing yards and 24 points scored, and Gene Raesz with 373 receiving yards. Raesz was selected by both the Associated Press and United Press International as a first-team player on the 1962 All-Southwest Conference football team.

Schedule

References

Rice
Rice Owls football seasons
Rice Owls football